The Cincinnati Film Festival is a yearly cultural event and international film competition held in Cincinnati, Ohio, supporting surrounding tri-state region. Since 2010, the all-volunteer staff had screened over 1000 submitted films from 36 countries.

History 

 The 2010 event was a collaborative event with the former Oxford International Film Festival, screened over 100 films and was held over 9 days in 11 venues across the Ohio, Kentucky and Indiana tri-state region. Held October 8–16, 2010, submissions were sent in from 31 countries.
 The 2011 festival scaled back to 90 films over 4 days, September 29 - October 2, 2011 and held in downtown Cincinnati, during the first official "Film in Cincinnati Week".
 The 2012 festival screened over 100 films September 6–13, 2012 at the Esquire Theatre, Clifton Performance Theatre, and Clifton Cultural Arts Center in the Clifton area, St. Michael the Archangel Church in Lower Price Hill, Cincinnati, the Public Library of Cincinnati and Hamilton County and the Emery Theatre in the Over-the-Rhine district of Cincinnati. Screening events earlier that year also took place at the Cincinnati Art Museum.
 In 2015, The CFF brought on award-winning screenwriter and Founder of Screenwriting Staffing, Jacob N. Stuart, to quarterback their Screenplay Contest.

Culture 
This Film Festival also includes several question and answer sessions, panels and filmmaker workshops led by industry professionals.

Partners 
The CFF is also a Community Cinema partner, bringing the Independent Television Service films broadcast on Independent Lens. It also runs the Cincinnati leg of the international competition, the 48 Hour Film Project.

References

External links

Film festivals in Ohio
Festivals in Cincinnati